Grand Falls may refer to:

Canada 
Grand Falls, New Brunswick
Grand Falls-Windsor, Newfoundland and Labrador
Grand Falls, a former name for Churchill Falls on the Churchill River in Labrador

It can also refer to these Canadian federal or provincial electoral districts:
Bonavista—Gander—Grand Falls—Windsor federal electoral district in Newfoundland and Labrador
Gander—Grand Falls former federal electoral district
Grand Falls-Buchans provincial electoral district of Newfoundland and Labrador
Grand Falls Region provincial electoral district of New Brunswick

United States 
Grand Falls, Arizona
Grand Falls Plaza, Missouri
Grand Falls, Minnesota
Grand Galet Falls